Ann MacLean  is a Canadian politician, mental health therapist, and social worker. She was elected to Councillor of New Glasgow, Nova Scotia in 1985 and mayor in 1991. She was the first female Mayor in New Glasgow's history.

Early life and education
MacLean earned her Bachelor of Arts and master's degree in Social Work from Dalhousie University.

Career
In 1976, MacLean founded the Metropolitan Mental Health Group Homes Association and later the Tearmann Society for Abused Women in 1984. The following year, MacLean was elected to New Glasgow, Nova Scotia's Town Council, before running for mayor. In 1991, she became the first female in New Glasgow, Nova Scotia's history to be elected mayor.

From 2004 until 2005, while serving as mayor, MacLean was appointed president of the national Board of the Federation of Canadian Municipalities. During her term as president, she worked with mayor Anna Allen to encourage more woman to join political offices. She also began to develop women's shelters, which was a taboo topic at the time. After being re-elected mayor in 2004, MacLean decided to leave politics in 2008. Upon her retirement, she became the longest-serving mayor in New Glasgow's history of New Glasgow. The next year, the Federation of Canadian of Municipalities created The Ann MacLean Award for Outstanding Service by a Woman in Municipal Politics to honour her achievements.

In 2013, MacLean chaired the Pictou County United Way's Leaders of the Way Campaign and was later named to the Halifax International Airport Authority board of directors. In 2019, MacLean was the recipient of the Order of Nova Scotia.

References

External links 
 Ann MacLean Award

Living people
People from New Glasgow, Nova Scotia
20th-century Canadian women politicians
21st-century Canadian women politicians
Nova Scotia municipal councillors
Women municipal councillors in Canada
Mayors of places in Nova Scotia
Dalhousie University alumni
Members of the Order of Nova Scotia
Year of birth missing (living people)
Women mayors of places in Nova Scotia